Margareta Birgersdotter Grip (1538–1586), was a Swedish baroness, writer and landowner. She is known for her writing: she copied letters and documents from the Middle Ages, the originals of which have since been lost, and for her genealogical research. Genealogical works became common among the nobility after her day, and her work is considered the first of the genre in Sweden.

Life
She was born to riksråd baron Birger Nilsson Grip and Brita Joachimsdotter Brahe. After the death of her mother in 1554, she attended the royal court prior to her marriage.

In 1562, she married the noble Erik Månsson Natt och Dag, son of Måns Johansson and Barbro Eriksdotter. She was thereby the sister-in-law of the lady-in-waiting Karin Gyllenstierna, who were also her neighbor on the estate Säby. After being widowed shortly after, she managed the estate Brokind Castle on behalf of her minor son Erik Eriksson Natt och Dag (d. 1566). After the death of her son, she inherited the Bro estate personally. In 1571, she married riksråd Sten Axelsson Banér. However, she remained the sole manager of the Bro estate.

Margareta Birgersdotter Grip has been claimed to be the Mistress of the Robes of Queen Karin Månsdotter in 1567–1568. However, Elin Andersdotter is confirmed to have had that position.

Margareta Grip copied a large amount of documents and letters from the Middle Ages, whose originals have since been lost, and who are therefore important historical documents. She produced a genealogical work, with the intent of vindicating her ancestor, Bo Jonsson Grip, a work she started in 1574. Genealogical research became common among the nobility in the late 16th century, but Grip are regarded as the pioneer of this genre in Sweden. Her work is kept at the Trolleholm Castle archive.

References

Citations

Bibliography
 Svenska adelns ättar-taflor / Afdelning 3. von Nackreij - Skytte
 http://www.wisthbf.se/slott-torp/allmaent/Rosman-BS-del2-053.pdf
 Grip, släkter, urn:sbl:13203, Svenskt biografiskt lexikon, hämtad 2015-02-14.
 http://www.adelsvapen.com/genealogi/Grip

Further reading

1538 births
16th-century Swedish landowners
1586 deaths
Copyists
Swedish genealogists
16th-century Swedish women writers
16th-century Swedish writers
Women historians
16th-century women landowners